The following is a list of recurring Saturday Night Live characters and sketches introduced between September 30, 2006, and May 19, 2007, the thirty-second season of SNL.

Jon Bovi
Jon Bovi is a Bon Jovi opposite band played by Will Forte and Jason Sudeikis. All of their songs consist of popular hits, usually but not always by Bon Jovi, with the lyrics reversed; for example, "Your love is like bad medicine/Bad medicine is what I need," becomes, "Your hate is like good medicine/Good medicine is not what I need."

After debuting in a 2006 sketch with Jaime Pressly, all subsequent Jon Bovi appearances were on Weekend Update.

Appearances

A Christmas-themed sketch that was cut from a dress rehearsal was reenacted on the Late Night with Seth Meyers segment "Second-Chance Theater" on February 13, 2019.

Two Gay Guys
Portrayed by Fred Armisen and Bill Hader, the "Two Gay Guys from New Jersey" appear on Weekend Update to comment about current events. They embody many stereotypes of New Jersey residents, similar to the characters of The Sopranos (including dropping hints about Mafia connections and activities). They wear matching track suits and gold medallions. The couple interact with each other like good friends, while sprinkling their conversations with reminders that they are in a homosexual relationship.

Appearances

Blizzard Man

Andy Samberg plays a terrible, yet acclaimed, white rapper. Each sketch takes place in a recording studio where Blizzard Man is asked to come in and work with a major rap star.

Appearances

Aunt Linda
Portrayed by Kristen Wiig, Aunt Linda is Amy Poehler's (fictitious) aunt, who appears on Weekend Update to give almost entirely negative reviews of recent films. But instead of allocating the films a star rating or thumbs up, she reviews each film with her own catchphrases, such as "Whaaat?" or "Oh, brother!" For example, when reviewing Ocean's Thirteen, she gives it "13 Ghaas!" and a "Puhhhleez!"

Her reason for disliking the film is often due to her own misunderstandings, such as when she thought Happy Feet was supposed to be a live action film, or when she thought Ocean's Thirteen was going to be the thirteenth film in the series.

She sometimes ends her appearances by praising a film that you wouldn't expect her to like, such as when she praised Saw III and was asked by Amy Poehler "you went to see Saw?" and Aunt Linda responded, "See it! I liked it so much I kidnapped Tobin Bell and forced him to play a game with me!"

Wiig writes Aunt Linda's appearances with Paula Pell. The character originated when Wiig was performing with the Groundlings, as she described in an interview:It was a woman who was on the plane who was watching the in-flight movie, which was The Matrix, and she was so confused by it. She didn’t understand anything and she just kept talking to the people, like, "What is going on?" I tried it as a sketch at SNL five times. It went to dress maybe three times, and finally someone was like, "Why don’t you try her at Update?" so that's how she eventually got on the show.

Appearances
{| class="wikitable" style="width:100%;"
|- 
!  style="background:#B0C4DE;" width="5%" | Season
!  style="background:#B0C4DE;" width="20%" | Episode
!  style="background:#B0C4DE;" width="30%" | Host
!  style="background:#B0C4DE;" width="45%" | Notes
|-
| 32 || November 11, 2006 || Alec Baldwin || Aunt Linda is not impressed with Babel, Happy Feet, or Flushed Away, but loved Saw III for its pacing, performances, and soundtrack.
|-
| 32 || December 2, 2006 || Matthew Fox || Aunt Linda criticizes Borat, Casino Royale, and "Apaclypto" (Apocalypto), finding all disappointing, but ends the segment deciding to see the Rockefeller Center Christmas Tree. 
|-
| 32 || February 24, 2007 || Rainn Wilson || Aunt Linda pans Oscar-nominated films The Queen, The Pursuit of Happyness and Letters from Iwo Jima, but liked The Fast and the Furious: Tokyo Drift.
|-
| 32 || May 19, 2007 || Zach Braff || Aunt Linda doesn't like Pirates of the Caribbean: Dead Man's Chest, Ocean's Thirteen, or Rush Hour 3. 
|-
| 34 || November 1, 2008 || Ben Affleck || Aunt Linda doesn't like new TV series Life on Mars and Knight Rider, but praises Californication'''s "great storylines, realistic acting, and genitals."
|-
| 35 || April 10, 2010 || Tina Fey || Aunt Linda disapproves of Clash of the Titans, Alice in Wonderland, Tooth Fairy, and Avatar.
|-
|}
Wiig, in her episode of Inside the Actors Studio, revived the Aunt Linda character in a review of Citizen Kane, which she criticized for its length, lack of color, and twist ending. When asked to name a film she liked, Aunt Linda replied: "Jumanji."

Bronx Beat
Blunt, disgusted Bronx housewives Betty Caruso (Amy Poehler) and Jodi Deitz (Maya Rudolph) host a talk show. In most of this sketch's iterations, the ladies fawn over an attractive male guest.

One sketch appeared in the dress rehearsal for the May 8, 2010, episode (hosted by Betty White), but was cut for the live episode.

MacGruber

Will Forte plays a special operations agent in a parody of MacGyver. The character starred in its own film in 2010.

Appearances

Really?!?
A Weekend Update Segment

The Dakota Fanning Show
Precocious child actress Dakota Fanning (Amy Poehler) hosts her own talk show, which she describes as "the only forum for child actors to discuss cinema, theater, politics, philosophy, and the cultural zeitgeist at large." The highly intellectual Dakota has trouble relating to her guests; for example, while talking to Dylan and Cole Sprouse about their sitcom The Suite Life of Zack & Cody, Dakota says the word "hotel" "invokes images of [the film] Hotel Rwanda, about the Rwandan genocide", prompting Dylan Sprouse to say, "Dakota, you're scaring us." Her references are frequently lost on the show's cheerful bandleader, Reggie Hudson (Kenan Thompson), leading her to make condescending remarks such as "If it isn't in the check-out line at Wal-Mart, Reggie hasn't read it." Dakota herself often professes to be "not familiar" with popular entertainment such as Family Guy, ESPN, or Harry Potter. Kristen Wiig appears as Dakota's mother, whom she addresses as Catherine, despite her mother's requests to call her Mom.

Poehler also played Dakota Fanning in a sketch on the September 29, 2007, episode, where she presented a Kid's Choice Award (while commenting, "It's so weird that they asked me, Dakota Fanning, to present the award for Best TV Show, because I don't even own'' a TV!").

Song Memories
Four buddies (Jason Sudeikis, Bill Hader, Will Forte and the host) hear a favorite old song playing and sing along to the chorus together, while sharing disturbing memories during the verses. Most sketches end with the group performing a non-sequitur activity (e.g. staging a robbery, accidental gun discharge, Tea Party protest) and a stylized "The End". The final sketch ends with guests Mumford & Sons leading the cast into the audience for a sing-along. Andy Samberg replaced Forte in the "Wild World" sketch featuring Ed Helms and Kenan Thompson replaced him in the "You've Got To Hide Your Love Away" sketch featuring Joseph Gordon-Levitt.

Appearances

La Rivista Della Televisione
Bill Hader plays Vinny Vedecci, the rude, sexist host of an Italian talk show; that week's SNL guest plays themselves as a guest on the show. Vedecci welcomes the guest and begins speaking to them in rapid Italian, prompting the guest to admit they don't speak Italian. Vedecci speaks angrily (in Italian) to his director (Fred Armisen), who is seen at a table offstage eating spaghetti with his silent assistant (Will Forte and later Paul Brittain). Vedecci proceeds to ask the guest weird questions in broken English. He sometimes leads the conversation to another celebrity (who may or may not have anything to do with the guest), and proceeds to interrupt the interview with a brief, perfect imitation of that celebrity. Often, Vedecci's young son (Bobby Moynihan) will run on-stage to ask the guest an incomprehensible question; the guest's flummoxed response leads the boy to begin wailing until his father pacifies him with a cigarette or other adult vice.

Appearances

This sketch also appeared in the dress rehearsal for the April 21, 2007, episode, hosted by Scarlett Johansson, but was cut for the live broadcast.

Penelope
Each installment of this sketch takes place at a party or gathering of some sort. Kristen Wiig plays Penelope, a guest at the party who speaks in a shaking, nervous voice, compulsively twirls her curly brown hair around her fingers and is obsessed with one-upping any anecdote that any other guest at the party tells about themselves.

In each sketch, one party guest, usually the episode's host, becomes fed up with Penelope's one-upmanship and begins a tit-for-tat one-upmanship battle with Penelope which becomes increasingly absurd, in the style very reminiscent of the classic Four Yorkshiremen sketch.  The first installment of the sketch simply ended with the character played by episode host, Peyton Manning, angrily storming off, leaving Penelope alone, muttering to herself.  However, in most subsequent installments, after her one-upmanship rival stormed off in disgust, Penelope would do one of the absurd things she had claimed to be able to do in the one-upmanship battle (such as turning invisible, becoming black and white, or shrinking herself so small that she could use a stalk of celery as a raft), causing the viewer to wonder if, in fact, all of her statements were true.

Appearances

References

Lists of recurring Saturday Night Live characters and sketches
Saturday Night Live in the 2000s
Saturday Night Live
Saturday Night Live